The Thorn-Stingley House is a historic house in Homer, Alaska, listed on the National Register of Historic Places in 2001. Built in 1945, it is one of the city's few little-altered examples of housing built in Homer's boom years following World War II. It was built by Francis H. Thorn, a well-driller and was occupied by him and/or his family until 1973.
The house is a -story wood-frame structure, roughly rectangular in shape, with a side-gable roof and a full basement that includes a one-car garage.  It is a local interpretation of the Bungalow style, with a pair of gable-roof dormers projecting from the front roof, and a projecting gable-roofed hood above the main entrance.  The front facade is divided into three asymmetrical bays, with a grouping of three sash windows in the left bay (over the garage entrance), the entry in the center, and a single sash window to the right.

See also
National Register of Historic Places listings in Kenai Peninsula Borough, Alaska

References

Houses on the National Register of Historic Places in Alaska
Houses completed in 1945
Houses in Kenai Peninsula Borough, Alaska
Homer, Alaska
1945 establishments in Alaska
Bungalow architecture in Alaska
Buildings and structures on the National Register of Historic Places in Kenai Peninsula Borough, Alaska